The 35th Flying Training Squadron was a United States Air Force unit, last assigned to the 64th Operations Group at Reese Air Force Base, Texas.  The squadron was inactivated in 1996 as the 64th Flying Training Wing began drawing down in preparation for the closing of Reese the following year.  The squadron had performed Undergraduate pilot training at Reese since 1972.

The squadron was first activated as the 64th Transport Squadron in 1942.  As the 64th Troop Carrier Squadron it participated in combat in the European, Mediterranean and China-Burma-India Theaters, earning a Distinguished Unit Citation.  Following VE Day, the squadron moved to Trinidad, where it was inactivated in July 9145.

History

World War II

The squadron was first activated in February 1942 as the 35th Transport Squadron at Olmsted Field, Pennsylvania and equipped with military models of the Douglas DC-3, primarily the C-47 Skytrain, for training.  In June, the squadron moved to Westover Field, Massachusetts, where it was assigned to the 64th Transport Group and prepared for overseas movement, which occurred the following month, after it was redesignated the 35th Troop Carrier Squadron.

Upon its arrival overseas, the squadron trained with paratrooper and glider units in airborne operations for Operation Torch, the invasion of North Africa.  On 10 November the air echelon flew from England via Gibraltar and on the following day landed personnel of the British 3rd Parachute Battalion at Maison Blanche (now Dar El Beïda), near Algiers. By mid-December, the squadron's ground echelon joined the air echelon at Blida Airfield, Algeria.

The group dropped paratroops to capture airfields and destroy bridges, during the battle for Tunisia; Operation Husky, the invasion of Sicily in July 1943; and Operation Avalanche, the invasion of Italy in September 1943.

In April 1944, most of the squadron was detached to India where it aided in the Allied offensive in Burma, where it earned a Distinguished Unit Citation.  The squadron returned to Sicily in mid-Jun 1944.  It moved to Italy the following month and participated in Operation Dragoon , the assault on southern France in August 1944, releasing gliders and paratroops. It moved to Waller Field, Trinidad without aircraft, in June 1945 and inactivated there in July 1945.

Cold War and War in Vietnam

The squadron was again activated at Donaldson Air Force Base, South Carolina in July 1952, assuming the Fairchild C-82 Packets and personnel of the 57th Troop Carrier Squadron, an Air Force Reserve unit that had been called to active duty for the Korean War.  In 1953, the 35th replaced its C-82s with newer Fairchild C-119 Flying Boxcars.  The squadron transported personnel and equipment worldwide and participated in joint training operations with the 82nd Airborne Division until it was inactivated in July 1954.

The squadron transported cargo and personnel in the Far East and Southeast Asia, 1963–1971

Pilot training
The squadron was redesignated the 35th Flying Training Squadron and activated at Reese Air Force Base, Texas in 1972.  It conducted undergraduate pilot training at Reese until it was inactivated in 1996.

Lineage
 Constituted as the 35th Transport Squadron on 2 February 1942
 Activated on 14 February 1942
 Redesignated 35th Troop Carrier Squadron on 4 July 1942
 Inactivated on 31 July 1945
 Redesignated 35th Troop Carrier Squadron, Medium on 3 July 1952
 Activated on 14 July 1952
 Inactivated on 21 July 1954
 Activated on 20 December 1962 (not organized)
 Organized on 8 January 1963
 Redesignated 35th Troop Carrier Squadron on 8 December 1965
 Redesignated 35th Tactical Airlift Squadron on 1 August 1967
 Inactivated on 31 March 1971
 Redesignated 35th Flying Training Squadron on 14 April 1972
 Activated on 1 October 1972
 Inactivated on 31 July 1996

Assignments
 315th Transport Group, 14 February 1942
 64th Transport Group (later 64th Troop Carrier Group), 9 June 1942 – 31 July 1945
 64th Troop Carrier Group, 14 July 1952 – 21 July 1954
 Pacific Air Forces, 20 December 1962 (not organized)
 315th Air Division, 8 January 1963
 374th Troop Carrier Wing (later 374th Tactical Airlift Wing), 8 August 1966 – 31 March 1971
 64th Flying Training Wing, 1 October 1972
 64th Operations Group, 15 December 1991 – 31 July 1996

Stations
 Olmsted Field, Pennsylvania, 14 February 1942
 Westover Field, Massachusetts, 8 June – 31 July 1942
 RAF Ramsbury (Station 469), England, 18 August – c. 10 November 1942 (operated from Casablanca Airfield, French Morocco, after 14 November 1942)
 Blida Airfield, Algeria, c. 12 December 1942 (operated from Telergma Airfield, Algeria, 4 January – 21 March 1943)
 Kairouan Airfield, Tunisia, 28 June 1943
 El Djem Airfield, Tunisia, 26 July 1943
 Comiso Airfield, Sicily, 7 September 1943 (operated from bases in India, April – June 1944)
 Ciampino Airfield, Italy, 8 July 1944 (operated from Istres Air Base (Y-17), France, 6 September – 11 October 1944)
 Rosignano Airfield, Italy, 9 January – 23 May 1945
 Waller Field, Trinidad, 4 June – 31 July 1945
 Donaldson Air Force Base, South Carolina, 14 July 1952 – 21 July 1954
 Naha Air Base, Okinawa, 8 January 1963 – 31 March 1971
 Reese Air Force Base, Texas, 1 October 1972 – 31 July 1996

Aircraft
 Douglas C-47 Skytrain, 1942–1945
 Fairchild C-82 Packet, 1952–1953
 Fairchild C-119 Flying Boxcar, 1953–1954
 C-130A Hercules, 1963–1971
 Cessna T-37 Tweet, 1972–1996

Awards and campaigns

References

Notes

Citations

Bibliography

External links

0035